= Vasudev Laxman Panshikar =

Indian scholar (1860 – 1937)

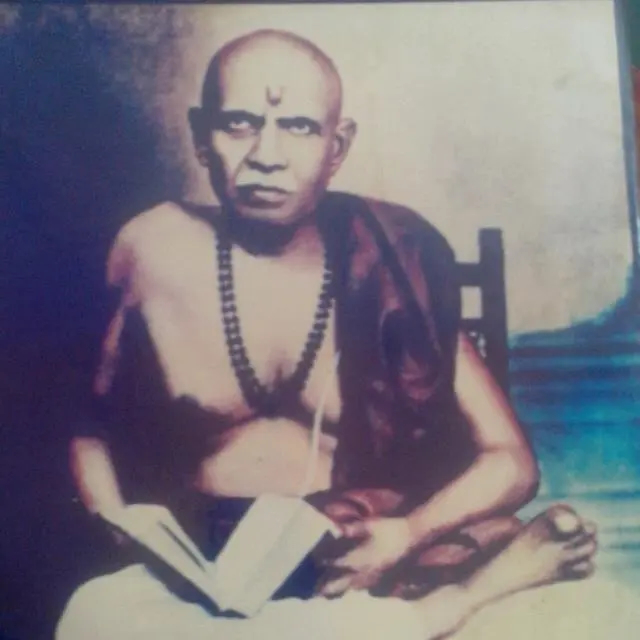
- Born: 1860; Panshi, Bombay State, British Raj
- Died: 1937 (aged 76–77)
- Occupations: Editor, scholar of Sanskrit literature

Vasudev Laxman Panshikar (1860 – 1937) was an Indian textual editor and scholar. He dedicated his career to the translation, editing, and correction of Sanskrit literature, along with various religious and saintly texts.

== Biography ==
Panshikar was born in 1860 into a family of scholars (panditi gharana) in Panshi. He took up writing relatively late in life, beginning his literary efforts after reaching the age of forty.

He worked with the Nirnaya Sagar Press, where he was given the responsibility of editing saint literature and religious texts printed by the press. Panshikar devoted his entire life to the textual correction, translation, and editorial preservation of Sanskrit works. He died in 1937.

== Literary works ==
Panshikar edited and compiled several substantial religious volumes and authored shorter booklets for religious occasions. In 1903, his editorial work Tukarama-chi Gatha, a comprehensive text spanning 910 pages, was published. This work achieved significant reach, with five editions being issued over the course of twenty-five years. His other major editorial works on religious texts include Shishupalandharma (546 pages), Vedastuti and a Marathi translation of Nirnayasinghu (685 pages).

Panshikar also authored a series of small booklets containing stories and ritual narratives for various traditional fasts and festivals, including Rishipanchami, Mangalagauri, Somavati, Sankashti, Shivaratri, and Varadalakshmi. His most significant scholarly contribution is considered to be the editing of the text titled Ratnakar. He undertook the textual purification, correction, and editing of this major work in collaboration with Krishnaji Soman.
